The Fongshan Stadium, formerly known as the Kaohsiung County Stadium (高雄縣立體育場), is a multi-purpose stadium in Fongshan District, Kaohsiung, Taiwan. It is currently used mostly for football matches and serves as the home venue of the Taipower Football Club. The stadium is able to hold 18,000 people and was opened in 1976.

Transportation
The stadium is accessible by walking about 700m (2300ft) South of exit 1 of the Fongshan Station of the Kaohsiung MRT.

See also
 List of stadiums in Taiwan
 Sports in Taiwan

References

1976 establishments in Taiwan
Athletics (track and field) venues in Taiwan
Football venues in Taiwan
Multi-purpose stadiums in Taiwan
Sports venues completed in 1976
Sports venues in Kaohsiung